Martin Carelse (born 21 November 1980 in Alberton, Gauteng) is a South African association football defender for Premier Soccer League club Vasco da Gama.

External links
Player's profile at absapremiership.co.za

1980 births
Living people
People from Alberton, Gauteng
South African soccer players
Kaizer Chiefs F.C. players
Association football defenders
Cape Town Spurs F.C. players
Cape Coloureds
AmaZulu F.C. players
Free State Stars F.C. players
Dynamos F.C. (South Africa) players
Sportspeople from Gauteng